Anauk Mibaya is one of 37 nats in the official Burmese pantheon of nats. She was Queen Shin Mi-Nauk, consort of King Minkhaung I and mother of Crown Prince Minye Kyawswa and King Thihathu of Ava. Her son Thihathu also entered the pantheon as Aung Pinle Hsinbyushin.

She allegedly died of a heart attack after being startled by seeing Min Kyawzwa (U Min Gyaw) on a magic stallion in a cotton field. She is portrayed with a headdress sitting on a lotus and nursing her baby.

References

34
Burmese goddesses